Sky Is Open is the sixth studio album by the American singer and songwriter Donna de Lory, independently released on July 19, 2006. Three songs on the album originally appeared on her fourth studio album In the Glow (2003): "One Day", "Glow" and "In the Sun".

Track listing

References 

2006 albums
Donna De Lory albums